William Laing may refer to:
 William Laing (Medal of Honor), soldier in the Union Army and a Medal of Honor recipient
 William Laing (artist), Scottish/Canadian artist 
 William Laing (athlete), Ghanaian athlete
 William Kirby Laing, British civil engineer
 William Roy Laing, Australian rules footballer

See also
 Bill Laing, Canadian ice hockey player
 Billy Laing, Scottish footballer